Utica Daily Press Building, also known as Gaffney Communications, is a historic building located at Utica in Oneida County, New York. It was built in 1904-1905 as offices and printing plant for the Utica Daily Press.  It consists of a -story rectangular brick main block, with two 1-story additions.

It was listed on the National Register of Historic Places in 1993.

References

Newspaper headquarters in the United States
Newspaper buildings
Buildings and structures in Utica, New York
Office buildings on the National Register of Historic Places in New York (state)
Industrial buildings completed in 1905
Office buildings completed in 1905
Industrial buildings and structures on the National Register of Historic Places in New York (state)
1905 establishments in New York (state)
National Register of Historic Places in Oneida County, New York